Motivé-e-s (also called Les Motivés!) is a leftist band and French political movement created in Toulouse by members of the music group Zebda.

History 
Motivé-e-s secured 12.49% of the votes in the municipal elections of March 2001 in Toulouse after a media campaign focusing on participatory democracy. The group employed four municipal councilors: Isabelle Riviere, Michel Desmars, Salah Amokrane, and Elisabeth Heysch de la Borde.

Motivé-e-s denounced the choice of their former member, Magyd Cherfi, to support the Socialist Party candidate, Pierre Cohen, in an open letter entitled "Magyd, your choice is not ours".

In the 2008 municipal elections in Toulouse, Motivé-e-s chose not to participate in the unitary list led by Myriam Martin's Anticapitalist Left, as they wanted to create left unity, while bringing their seven years of experience to the municipal council.

Discography 
Chants de lutte

Motivés ! Y'a toujours pas d'arrangement !

Other works 

 2018: Soundtrack for the film I Feel Good by Benoît Delépine and Gustave Kervern.

Artists 

 Magyd Cherfi (Zebda)
 Hakim et Mustapha Amokrane (Zebda)
 Philippe Dutheil
 Jean Luc Amestoy
 Rémi Mouillérac
 Céline Amokrane-Chesnel
 Marc Dechaumont
 Anne-Laure Madaule-Grellety
 François Bombaglia

References 

Political parties of the French Fifth Republic